Good Morning Gorgeous is the fourteenth studio album by American singer Mary J. Blige, released on February 11, 2022, through 300 Entertainment and her Mary Jane Productions imprint. It marked her first release for 300 Entertainment and her first album that was not released by a subsidiary of Universal Music.

The album includes collaborations with Anderson .Paak, Dave East, DJ Khaled, Fivio Foreign, and Usher. It was preceded and supported by three singles: "Good Morning Gorgeous", "Amazing" featuring DJ Khaled, and "Rent Money" featuring Dave East.

The deluxe version of the album received six nominations at the 65th Grammy Awards including Album of the Year and Best R&B Album.

Promotion
Blige revealed the track listing on January 21, 2022, alongside the release of "Rent Money". Two days after the album release, Blige performed during the Super Bowl LVI halftime show alongside Dr. Dre, Snoop Dogg, Eminem and Kendrick Lamar.

Singles
Blige released the first two singles, "Good Morning Gorgeous", which peaked at number 83 on the Billboard Hot 100, and "Amazing" featuring DJ Khaled, on December 5, 2021. On January 31, 2022, she released the third single, "Rent Money" featuring Dave East. On June 30, she released the fourth single, "Come See About Me" featuring Fabolous.

Reception

Good Morning Gorgeous was met with generally favorable reviews from music critic. On review aggregator Metacritic, the album received a score of 75 out of 100 based on 7 reviews.

Leah Greenblatt, reviewing the album for Entertainment Weekly, points out that "with her 15th studio album, the queen of hip-hop/soul dives into life as a single woman" because "if 2017's Strength of a Woman was her record about divorce rovisonos, [...] Gorgeous is the sound of an artist slowly re-emerging." Greenblatt writes that "as a songwriter, Blige's gift has never been so much specificity as sincerity, and the songs on Gorgeous deal with topics so familiar that they have worn out like the grooves on a vinyl record: hope, pain, learning to love and let go; [...] in the freedom that comes from no longer having privileged consideration in the pop market."

Clash's Robin Murray calls the singer "a phenomenon" as "her graceful touch defies time and trends, with her vivid approach pushing toward a more universal sense of connection." Murray, at the end of the review, writes that one hears "a record that exudes charm and grace." Mosi Reeves of Rolling Stone writes that "almost all of Blige's 15 albums have a conceptual structure; [...] but Good Morning Gorgeous seems looser than others" in which "the artist carefully avoids the deep melancholy of her past. The music is mostly hopeful and lively, even when the sentiments belie that."

Less enthusiastic Pitchfork's Eric Torres review, who although finds that the album "a celebratory record that mixes uplifting, soulful affirmations with exercises in contemporary rap and R&B", it has collaboration which "come across as scattered, an unfortunate side effect that hinders the album’s invigorating self-empowerment; [...] The album's assorted collaborations range from solid to baffling".

Industry awards

Commercial performance
In the United States, Good Morning Gorgeous debuted at No. 14 on the Billboard 200 with 25,000 equivalent album units earned in its first week. It also entered at No. 9 on the US Top R&B/Hip-Hop Albums chart, becoming Blige's 19th top-10 entry and surpassing Mariah Carey for the second most top-10 titles on the chart.

Track listing

Charts

References

2022 albums
Albums produced by D'Mile
Mary J. Blige albums
Albums produced by DJ Khaled
Albums produced by Swizz Beatz
Albums produced by J. White Did It
Albums produced by Anderson .Paak
Albums produced by Jerry Duplessis
Albums produced by London on da Track
Albums produced by Cool & Dre
Albums produced by Rogét Chahayed